Darcy Rolston Hepner (born December 22, 1954) is a Canadian/American saxophonist, composer, and arranger.

Biography 

Born in Edmonton, Alberta and raised in Hamilton, Ontario, he is the son of professional musicians (conductor Lee Hepner and pianist Patricia Rolston). His professional career began as a cellist at the age of 15 and transitioned to flute, clarinet, and saxophone during his studies at McMaster University (BMus 1978). While pursuing jazz studies at the University of Miami he performed with Henry Mancini, BB King, Aretha Franklin, Tony Bennett, Mel Tormé and many others (MMUS 1980). Moving to New York City in 1983 he studied composition and saxophone at New York University with Lee Konitz and Bob Mintzer. During his second residency in New York from 1996 to 2005, Hepner toured with Blood, Sweat and Tears, played in Broadway and Off-Broadway shows and in clubs with such artists as Buster Poindexter, Tom Wopat and the Ed Palermo Big Band.

Since 2008 he has recorded and performed with Tom Wilson (musician) and LeE HARVeY OsMOND as both a woodwind player and conductor/arranger for his symphony shows which have included performances with the Hamilton Philharmonic Orchestra and the National Arts Centre Orchestra in Ottawa.

In 2015, he collaborated with Canadian musician Ian Thomas as arranger and conductor to develop a concert for the Hamilton Philharmonic Orchestra. The music for the concert was used to produce Thomas's “Life In Song” recording.

Hepner taught at Berklee College of Music (Boston) 1985–89, and was founder and head of the Music Program at Selkirk College in Nelson, BC, 1989–96. From 2005 to 2020, he held the position of professor of music at Mohawk College, Hamilton.

Discography (selected) 

As Leader

The Darcy Hepner Jazz Orchestra

•	Blues In Another Minute (Water Street 2010)

As Sideman

With The Berlin Contemporary Jazz Orchestra

•	The Morlocks and Other Pieces (FMP/Free Music Production 1993)

With Larry Carlton

•	Plays the Sound of Philadelphia (335 2010)

With Andy Middleton

•	Reinventing the World (Intuition 2003)

With Ian Thomas

•	A Life In Song (Universal Music 2016)

With Tom Wilson (LeE HARVeY OsMOND)

•	A Quite Evil (Latent Recordings 2008)

•	The Folk Sinner (Latent Recordings 2013)

•	Beautiful Scars (Latent Recordings 2015)

•	Symphonic Scars (TCW 2018)

•	Mohawk (Latent Recordings 2019)

References 

"Darcy Hepner | The Canadian Encyclopedia" thecanadianencyclopedia.ca. Retrieved 2013-12-05
"Darcy Hepner -Canada Jazz - Canada's Finest Jazz Artists" canadajazz.net. Retrieved 2013-01-31
"A CurtainUp Review Stray Cats" curtainup.com. May 14, 1998 
"Newly Discovered Charlie Parker Arrangements Played in Upcoming Concert" jazzelements.com. February 16, 2006 
"Darcy Hepner gets the big band back together" The Spectator, January 12, 2008
"A bit of New York jazz comes to Corktown" The Spectator, February 16, 2016 
"Ian Thomas: A Life in Song" The Spectator, June 16, 2016
"Lee Harvey Osmond in Madison madison.eventful.com November 6, 2016
"From The Beatles With Love" looklocalmagazine.com January 14, 2019
The Morlocks and Other Pieces (FMP, 1994)
"The McMaster University Alumni Awards" " Faculty of Humanities, 2009 

1954 births
Living people
Canadian jazz bandleaders
Canadian jazz musicians
American jazz musicians
American male saxophonists